Events from the year 2012 in Brazil.

Incumbents

Federal government 
 President: Dilma Rousseff
 Vice President: Michel Temer

Governors
 Acre: Binho Marques
 Alagoas: Teotônio Vilela Filho
 Amapa: Camilo Capiberibe
 Amazonas: Omar Aziz
 Bahia: Jaques Wagner
 Ceará: Cid Gomes
 Espírito Santo: José Roberto Arruda
 Goiás: Marconi Perillo
 Maranhão: Roseana Sarney
 Mato Grosso: Blairo Maggi
 Mato Grosso do Sul: André Puccinelli
 Minas Gerais: Aécio Neves
 Pará: Ana Júlia Carepa
 Paraíba: José Maranhão
 Paraná: Roberto Requião
 Pernambuco: Eduardo Campos
 Piauí: Wellington Dias
 Rio de Janeiro: Sérgio Cabral Filho
 Rio Grande do Norte: Wilma de Faria
 Rio Grande do Sul: Yeda Crusius
 Rondônia: Ivo Cassol
 Roraima: José de Anchieta Júnior
 Santa Catarina: Luiz Henrique da Silveira
 São Paulo: José Serra
 Sergipe: Marcelo Déda
 Tocantins: Carlos Henrique Amorim

Vice governors
 Acre:	Carlos César Correia de Messias
 Alagoas: José Thomaz da Silva Nonô Neto
 Amapá: Doralice Nascimento de Souza
 Amazonas: José Melo de Oliveira
 Bahia: Otto Alencar
 Ceará: Domingos Gomes de Aguiar Filho
 Espírito Santo: Givaldo Vieira da Silva
 Goiás: José Eliton de Figueiredo Júnior
 Maranhão: Joaquim Washington Luiz de Oliveira
 Mato Grosso: Francisco Tarquínio Daltro
 Mato Grosso do Sul: Simone Tebet
 Minas Gerais: Alberto Pinto Coelho Júnior
 Pará: Helenilson Cunha Pontes
 Paraíba: Rômulo José de Gouveia
 Paraná: Flávio José Arns
 Pernambuco: João Soares Lyra Neto
 Piauí: Wilson Martins
 Rio de Janeiro: Luiz Fernando Pezão
 Rio Grande do Norte: Robinson Faria
 Rio Grande do Sul: Jorge Alberto Duarte Grill
 Rondônia: Airton Pedro Gurgacz
 Roraima: Francisco de Assis Rodrigues
 Santa Catarina: Eduardo Pinho Moreira
 São Paulo: Guilherme Afif Domingos
 Sergipe: Jackson Barreto
 Tocantins: João Oliveira de Sousa

Events

January

February 
February 13 – Lindemberg Alves Fernandes goes on trial for the death of ex-girlfriend Elóa Pimentel, in the city of Santo André.
February 13 – Lindemberg Alves Fernandes is convicted of all 12 crimes with which he is charged, and sentenced to 98 years and 10 months of imprisonment; Brazilian law meant that this would be limited to 30 years.

March 
May 25 – President Dilma Rousseff partially vetoed modifications to the Forest Law that protects the Amazon.

April 
10th Of April Bandu Gaming/Bernardo Was Born

May

June

July

August 
August 8 – The sixth annual International Female Orgasm Day is celebrated. The holiday was established by José Arimatéia Dantas Lacerda of Esperantina.

September

October 
October 7 – First round of voting in the Brazilian municipal elections, 2012.
October 28 – First round of the Brazilian municipal elections, 2012.

November 
November 25 – The 2012 Brazilian Grand Prix is held at the Autódromo José Carlos Pace in São Paulo, and is won by British driver Jenson Button for McLaren; it would be the victory of his Formula One career.

December

Deaths 
September 29 – Hebe Camargo, 83, television presenter, cardiac arrest.
December 5 – Oscar Niemeyer, 104, architect, respiratory infection.

See also 
 2012 in Brazilian football
 2012 in Brazilian television
 List of Brazilian films of 2012

References 

 
2010s in Brazil
Brazil
Brazil
Years of the 21st century in Brazil